International Front Runners (Frontrunners) is an umbrella organization of LGBT running and walking clubs around the world. The walking clubs are called Frontwalkers.

Activities
Most Front Runners clubs host one or more weekly fun runs. Following a 30-year tradition, members typically gather afterwards at a local restaurant.

Many of the larger clubs host social events such as potluck dinners and annual banquets; participate as a team in distance relays and international LGBT sporting events such as Gay Games, World Outgames, and EuroGames; and elect officers, have bylaws and a membership-dues structure.

A growing interest in walking has led some Front Runners clubs to add "Frontwalkers" to their club name.

Name variation
There are four different spellings of the organization name: Front Runners, FrontRunners, Frontrunners, and the infrequently used frontRunners.

History
The first FrontRunners club was formed in San Francisco in January, 1974 by Jack Baker and Gardner Pond. It started as an "introduction to jogging" group listed in the bimonthly publication of "Lavender U", which was organized to serve the gay and lesbian community. "Classes" such as creative writing, ballroom dancing, learning to play bridge, etc., were listed. Jack and Gardner were members of San Francisco's DSE Running Club and modeled the Lavender U Joggers after it.  The group met every Sunday at 10AM at a different scenic location. In 1978, Lavender U ceased to exist and the then-leader of the Lavender U Joggers, Bud Budlong, held a series of reorganization meetings that resulted in the group renaming itself "FrontRunners." The new name was inspired by Patricia Nell Warren's 1974 novel The Front Runner, about a gay track coach and a gay runner. Bylaws were written, dues were established, and the first election of officers was held in January, 1979. Several years later, the group changed its weekly run to Saturday at 9 AM at Stowe Lake in Golden Gate Park.

The second FrontRunners club was formed in 1979 when Malcolm Robinson, a runner and employee of New York Road Runners, organized a gay running club and modeled it after the FrontRunners. He called it Front Runners New York. Soon after, the Los Angeles Front Runners was formed. After the first Gay Games, held in San Francisco in 1982, many Front Runners clubs were organized throughout the United States and around the world.

Patricia Nell Warren, known as "Patches" to her Los Angeles Front Runners family, frequented the Los Angeles runs and annual dinners held by the LA group and participated in the annual Christopher Street West parade as part of the LA Front Runners contingent during the 1990s, thanks to then-president Marty Freedman and then-executive board member Kevin and Don Norte.

The International Front Runners was created and became a more formal body by drafting and adopting a mission statement and constitution at the Front Runners International Front Runner Forum in 1999.

Clubs around the world
There are over 100 Front Runners clubs worldwide, about half of which are in the United States. The International Front Runners website maintains a visual directory.

United States and Canada
Atlanta - Front Runners Atlanta https://frontrunnersatlanta.org
Calgary Front Runners in Calgary AB Canada (originally named Alpine Front Runners Club Calgary) running every Saturday @ 9 AM from the south end of the peace bridge and 3 seasons (except winter) Wednesdays @ 5:30 PM from the same location.
Chicago Frontrunners and Frontwalkers, inducted into the Chicago Gay and Lesbian Hall of Fame in 1995.
Colorado Front Runners, runs in Denver, Boulder, and the foothills.
DC Front Runners, since 1981
Houston Front Runners
Los Angeles
Nashville Frontrunners, formed in 2016, is an LGBTQ+ running club based in Nashville, Tennessee.
Front Runners New York, NYC’s LGBT running club. Founded 1979, affiliated with New York Road Runners (NYRR), and member club of Road Runners Club of America.
Philadelphia
San Francisco Front Runners, since 1974, LGBT Running and Walking Club Welcoming Everyone of All Abilities!
Seattle Frontrunners, since 1985 
Toronto - Front Runners Toronto, since 1987
Vancouver (BC) Frontrunners formed in 1983 and sponsor of the annual (July) Vancouver Pride Run & Walk.
 Long Beach Shoreline Frontrunners formed in 1984.

Europe
Amsterdam - Dutch Gay and Lesbian Athletics a.k.a. Frontrunners Amsterdam
Cologne
Dublin Front Runners 'Running With Pride' since 2005
Dundee Frontrunners
Edinburgh Frontrunners
Glasgow FrontRunners: an award-winning, inclusive community-based road-running group with strong links to Glasgow’s Lesbian, Gay, Bisexual and Transgender (LGBT) community and friends. Founded in 2010. Affiliated to Scottish Athletics and JogScotland
London Front Runners : a running club for gay, lesbian and transgender men and women and gay-friendly people who love running.
Manchester Frontrunners : founded in 2005, a friendly LGBT running club who welcome all people of all abilities.
Leeds Frontrunners: Founded in 2015, Leeds Front Runners is an inclusive community based running group with strong links to the LGBT community and their friends.
Lyon
Marseille : "Contre les discriminations, faisons du sport ensemble"
Milan
Newcastle Frontrunners, Formed in 2011 we welcome runners of all abilities, gender and sexual orientation.  We annually hold our LGBT 5K on Newcastle upon Tyne's famous Town Moor.
Nice - Front Runners Nice
Paris Front Runners, since 1992
Stockholm Frontrunners:
Brighton & Hove Frontrunners: Formed in 2018. Holding an annual rainbow run 5k the day before Brighton Pride

Asia Pacific
Sydney Front Runners, since 1983
Adelaide Frontrunners, since 2021

Famous Front Runners
 Actor George Takei met his husband Brad Altman during an LA Front Runners run in the 1980s.
 Dutch athlete Monique de Wilt had two personal records in the pole vault during the Gay Games in Amsterdam in 1998. She won the silver medal at the 1999 Summer Universiade. Only in 2005 both her Dutch national records (indoor and outdoor) were broken by Femke Pluim.
 The drag persona of Rupaul's Drag Race star Shuga Cain was born during the 2015 NYC Pride March, while marching as a member of Front Runners New York. A year later, she won the club's yearly Variety Hour. She started drag full time a year after that, then was chosen to be on the show's 11th season.

See also

Gay community
Fédération sportive gaie et lesbienne

References

Front Runners Atlanta

External links 
frontrunners.org
fsgl.org

International LGBT sports organizations
Running clubs
1974 establishments in California
Inductees of the Chicago LGBT Hall of Fame